This is a list of all (former) Member of the European Parliament for the Christian Democratic Appeal (CDA) from 1952. 
Source:

Seats in the European Parliament

Alphabetical

Delegation members of the European Coal and Steel Community Parliament (from 1952-58)

ARP

CHU

KVP

Delegation members of the European Parliament (1958-79)

ARP

CHU

KVP

Elected members of the European Parliament (from 1979) 
Current members of the European Parliament are in bold.
(period is the time they represented the Christian Democratic Appeal in the European Parliament.)

European Parliament periods

1952-1958 (Delegation members of the European Coal and Steel Community Parliament)

ARP 
 Cees Hazenbosch
 Willem Rip
 Sieuwert Bruins Slot

CHU 
 Franz Lichtenauer
 Gerrit Vixseboxse

KVP 
 Pieter Blaisse
 M.M.A.A. Janssen
 Marga Klompé
 Maan Sassen

1958-1979 (Delegation to the European Parliament)

ARP
 Barend Biesheuvel
 Jaap Boersma
 Kees Boertien
 Wilhelm Friedrich de Gaay Fortman
 Cees Hazenbosch
 Jan de Koning
 Willem Rip
 Jacqueline Rutgers

CHU
 Corstiaan Bos
 Johan van Hulst
 Franz Lichtenauer
 Durk van der Mei
 Willem Scholten
 Teun Tolman

KVP
 Marius van Amelsvoort
 Pieter Blaisse
 Tiemen Brouwer
 Flip van Campen
 M.M.A.A. Janssen
 Pierre Lardinois
 Joep Mommersteeg
 Harrij Notenboom
 Kees van der Ploeg
 Kees Raedts
 Piet van der Sanden
 Maan Sassen
 Wim Schuijt
 Wim Vergeer
 Tjerk Westerterp

1979-1984 

10 Seats:
 Bouke Beumer (top candidate)
 Elise Boot
 Frans van der Gun (replaced by: Joep Mommersteeg)
 Jim Janssen van Raaij
 Sjouke Jonker
 Hanja Maij-Weggen
 Harrij Notenboom
 Jean Penders
 Teun Tolman
 Wim Vergeer
 Joep Mommersteeg

1984-1989 

8 Seats:
 Bouke Beumer (top candidate)
 Elise Boot
 Yvonne van Rooy (replaced by: Jim Janssen van Raaij)
 Pam Cornelissen
 Hanja Maij-Weggen
 Jean Penders
 Teun Tolman
 Wim Vergeer
 Jim Janssen van Raaij

1989-1994 

10 Seats:
 Bouke Beumer
 Pam Cornelissen
 Jim Janssen van Raaij
 Hanja Maij-Weggen (replaced by: Bartho Pronk)
 Ria Oomen-Ruijten
 Arie Oostlander
 Karla Peijs
 Jean Penders (top candidate)
 Jan Sonneveld
 Maxime Verhagen
Bartho Pronk

1994-1999 

10 Seats:
 Hanja Maij-Weggen (top candidate)
 Peter Pex
 Wim van Velzen
 Bartho Pronk
 Arie Oostlander
 Jan Sonneveld
 Karla Peijs
 Ria Oomen-Ruijten
 Jim Janssen van Raaij
 Pam Cornelissen

1999-2004 

9 Seats:
 Albert Jan Maat
 Maria Martens
 Bert Doorn
 Hanja Maij-Weggen (top candidate) (replaced by: Cees Bremmer)
 Wim van Velzen
 Bartho Pronk
 Arie Oostlander
 Karla Peijs (replaced by: Peter Pex)
 Ria Oomen-Ruijten
 Peter Pex
 Cees Bremmer

2004-2009 

7 Seats:
 Bert Doorn
 Camiel Eurlings (top candidate) (replaced by: Joop Post)
 Albert-Jan Maat (replaced by: Esther de Lange)
 Maria Martens
 Lambert van Nistelrooij
 Ria Oomen-Ruijten
 Corien Wortmann-Kool
 Esther de Lange
 Joop Post (replaced by: Cornelis Visser)
 Cornelis Visser

2009-2014 

5 Seats: 
 Esther de Lange 
 Ria Oomen-Ruijten
 Wim van de Camp (top candidate)
 Lambert van Nistelrooij
 Corien Wortmann-Kool

2014-2019 

5 Seats: 
 Esther de Lange (top candidate)
 Annie Schreijer-Pierik 
 Wim van de Camp
 Jeroen Lenaers 
 Lambert van Nistelrooij

2019-2024 

4 Seats: 
 Esther de Lange (top candidate)
 Annie Schreijer-Pierik
 Jeroen Lenaers
 Tom Berendsen

References

Main